Richard C. Summerbell (born 29 June 1956) is a Canadian mycologist, author and award-winning songwriter. He was editor in chief of an international scientific journal in mycology from 2000 to 2004. In the 1970s and 80s, he was a gay activist and an early commentator on (then) controversial topics such as AIDS and promiscuity and attitudes to homosexuality in organized religion.

Born in Brooks, Alberta, Summerbell trained as a botanist, receiving his master's degree from the University of British Columbia and his doctorate degree from the University of Toronto. He has lived with his partner, Ross Fraser, since 1978 and currently resides in Toronto, Canada.

Research in Mycology

Summerbell has published over 150 peer-reviewed papers in mycology, botany and bacteriology, including research papers in Nature and Philosophical Transactions of the Royal Society. Much of the research explores opportunistic fungal pathogens—those that grow on (and at the expense of) humans and animals—and the unique ways in which these organisms exploit their environments. These environments are diverse. They include biofilms in hospital plumbing that harbour fungal pathogens which attack patients hospitalized for leukemia or major organ transplants. They also include waterfront vacation properties on streams, lakes or rivers that infect otherwise healthy visitors with the often deadly disease blastomycosis. His most cited works are on the fungi that cause human skin diseases (dermatophytes) and nail infections (onychomycosis). , his 1989 paper on onychomycosis is the most-cited original research paper published in the over 50-year history of the journal Mycoses.

Summerbell spent a decade as the Chief of Medical Mycology at the Ontario Ministry of Health Public Health Lab in Toronto, followed by 6 years as senior scientist at the Centraalbureau voor Schimmelcultures, a mycological institute and branch of the Royal Netherlands Academy of Arts and Sciences in Utrecht. He was editor-in-chief of the international scientific journal Medical Mycology from 2000 to 2004. Since 2008, he has been a faculty member of the University of Toronto Dalla Lana School of Public Health and research director of Sporometrics, a Toronto-based microbiological testing company.

Summerbell has co-authored two textbooks in medical mycology, Identifying Filamentous Fungi (simultaneously published in French as Champignons Filamenteux D'Intérêt Medical) and Laboratory Handbook of Dermatophytes.

Species (co-)described include:
 Arachnomyces kanei (asexual state Onychocola kanei), an invader of human nails
 Phaeoacremonium krajdenii, a cause of subcutaneous infection of humans
 Phaeoacremonium alvesii, a cause of subcutaneous infection of humans
 Phaeoacremonium amstelodamense, a cause of human joint infection
 Phaeoacremonium australiense, an endophyte of grapevines
 Phaeoacremonium griseorubrum, a cause of human fungemia (blood infection)
 Phaeoacremonium scolyti, an endophyte of grapevine, also isolated from bark beetle larvae
 Phaeoacremonium subulatum, an endophyte of grapevine
 Phaeoacremonium tardicrescens, from unspecified human medical source
 Phaeoacremonium venezuelense, from eumycetoma of the human foot
 Phaeoacremonium sphinctrophorum, from fungal cyst of the human foot
 Phaeoacremonium theobromatis, from stem of wild mountain cocoa (Theobroma gileri) in Ecuador
 Neocudoniella radicella, ectomycorrhizal with black spruce (Picea mariana)
 Teberdinia hygrophila a northern and alpine soil fungus
 Acremonium fuci, an endophyte of brown marine algae in the genus Fucus
 Acremonium exuviarum, from shed skin of lizard
 Fusarium delphinoides, from diseased succulent plant Hoodia gordonii and from human eye infection
 Fusarium biseptatum, from South African soil
 Fusarium penzigii, from decayed wood and human eye infection
 Phialosimplex caninus, cause of fatal infections in dogs
 Phaeomoniella pinifoliorum, a surface colonizer of pine needles
 Phaeomoniella zymoides, also from pine needles

The species Sarocladium summerbellii has been named in Summerbell's honour.

Gay activism

Summerbell began working as a gay activist in 1979 when he became president of the gay and lesbian student association at the University of British Columbia. He was co-host of Coming Out, Canada's first gay and lesbian radio programme on CFRO-FM in Vancouver from 1978 to 1980.  He was also an editor of the gay liberation magazine The Body Politic from 1982 to 1986 and a contributor to other early Canadian gay publications such as Q Magazine. As a gay activist, he was an early commentator on (then) controversial topics such as AIDS and promiscuity, and attitudes to homosexuality in Christianity, Judaism and Islam.

In 1985, he published a humorous look at gay life and culture entitled Abnormally Happy: A Gay Dictionary that satirizes stereotypical views of gays and lesbians.

Summerbell also authored an early safe sex campaign series called "Is There a Condom in Your Life?" in Toronto gay newspaper Xtra!, beginning in 1987.

Music

As a songwriter and musician, Summerbell released an independent CD, Light Carries On, in 2004.  One song from the CD, Thank you for being My Dog, won the 7th Annual Great American Song Contest in the Special Music category and won Summerbell a place in the Great American Song Hall of Fame. Songs by Summerbell have been included in several popular compilations of music by gay musicians. He has also written contemporary lyrics for the Huron Carol.

Books
 Identifying Filamentous Fungi, G. St. Germain & R. C. Summerbell, Star Publishing, Belmont CA, 1995, 
 Champignons Filamenteux D'Interêt Medical, G. St. Germain & R.C. Summerbell, Star Publishing, Belmont CA, 1995, 
 Laboratory Handbook of Dermatophytes, J. Kane, R. C. Summerbell, et al., Star Publishing, Belmont CA, 1996, 
 Abnormally Happy: A Gay Dictionary, Richard Summerbell, New Star Books, Vancouver BC, 1985,

References

External links

 Richard Summerbell on Google Scholar
  Identifying Filamentous Fungi (St. Germain, G. & R. C. Summerbell, Star Publishing, Belmont CA, 1996) 
 Champignons Filamenteux D'Interêt Medical (St. Germain, Guy & R.C. Summerbell, Star Publishing, Belmont CA, 1996) 
 Laboratory Handbook of Dermatophytes (Kane, J., R. C. Summerbell, L. Sigler, S. Krajden, & G. Land, Star Publishing, Belmont CA, 1996) 
 Richard Summerbell on Wikiquote
 Richard Summerbell's music on CBC Radio 3
 Gay music compilations featuring music written by Richard Summerbell
  Rewritten rock music version called The Lake Huron Carol set in the modern Lake Huron area
 Richard Summerbell's Myspace page
 Richard Summerbell in the Canadian Lesbian and Gay Archives

1956 births
Canadian mycologists
20th-century Canadian botanists
Canadian medical researchers
Canadian gay musicians
Canadian gay writers
Living people
People from Brooks, Alberta
University of British Columbia Faculty of Science alumni
University of Toronto alumni
Canadian LGBT journalists
Canadian LGBT scientists
Canadian LGBT songwriters
Canadian magazine journalists
Canadian magazine editors
Journalists from Alberta
Journalists from Toronto
Musicians from Alberta
Musicians from Toronto
Scientists from Alberta
Scientists from Toronto
Writers from Alberta
Writers from Toronto
Gay songwriters
Gay scientists
Gay journalists
Gay academics
20th-century Canadian LGBT people
21st-century Canadian LGBT people
21st-century Canadian botanists
Canadian LGBT academics